North Dakota was reduced to one seat, to be elected at-large.  One of the incumbents ran and won election to represent the state.  The other retired to run for Governor.

See also 
 List of United States representatives from North Dakota
 United States House of Representatives elections, 1972

1972
North Dakota
1972 North Dakota elections